Wilfried Bonifatius "Boni" Böse (7 February 1949, – 4 July 1976) was a founding member of the German organization Revolutionary Cells that was described in the early 1980s as one of Germany's most dangerous leftist terrorist groups by the West German Interior Ministry. He carried out attacks in Germany and in 1976 was involved in the hijacking of Air France Flight 139, that led to his death in Entebbe, Uganda during the Israeli operation to free the hostages.

Attacks in West Germany
Ilan Hartuv, one of the surviving hostages in the hijacking of Air France Flight 139 in 1976, recalled Böse saying to him during the hijacking that "I carried out terrorist acts in West Germany because the ruling establishment took Nazis and reactionaries into its service."

Hijacking of Air France Flight 139 
Böse was a leader of the 1976 hijacking of Air France Flight 139 from Tel Aviv, Israel to Paris, France via Athens, Greece. After diverting Air France Flight 139 to Entebbe, Uganda, Böse separated the Israelis from the other passengers; the other passengers were allowed to go home.  During the hijacking, Böse is reported to have told a Jewish passenger who had shown Böse his Auschwitz tattoo, "I'm no Nazi! ... I am an idealist." Böse was killed during Operation Entebbe. According to hostage Ilan Hartuv, Böse was hesitant to shoot the hostages. He ordered them to take shelter when Israel Defense Forces commandos stormed the airport terminal where the hostages were being held. The hijacking of Air France Flight 139 resulted in the deaths of four Israeli hostages.

Popular culture
Böse is played by Helmut Berger in the 1976 film Victory at Entebbe, by Klaus Kinski in Operation Thunderbolt (1977), by Horst Buchholz in Raid on Entebbe (1977), Aljoscha Stadelmann in Carlos (2010), and by Daniel Brühl in Entebbe (2018).

References

1949 births
1976 deaths
German Marxists
German anti-Zionists
Members of the Revolutionary Cells (German group)
Deaths by firearm in Uganda
Operation Entebbe
Hijackers